Edgar Richard Burgess FZS (23 September 1891 – 23 April 1952) was an English rower who competed for Great Britain in the 1912 Summer Olympics.

Burgess was born in London and educated at Eton College and Magdalen College, Oxford, where he was a Diploma student in anthropology. He joined Leander Club and was bowman of the Leander eight which won the gold medal for Great Britain rowing at the 1912 Summer Olympics. He was the only member of the crew who had not won a blue rowing in the Boat Race. In 1913, he was bow for the winning Oxford in the Boat Race.

Burgess was a member of the Inner Temple and spent many years with the Sudan Political Service. He was a Fellow of the Zoological Society. On retirement, he lived in Morocco where he died at his home in Tangier.

See also
List of Oxford University Boat Race crews

References

External links
 
 
 
 

1891 births
1952 deaths
Rowers from Greater London
Alumni of Magdalen College, Oxford
People educated at Eton College
English male rowers
British male rowers
English Olympic medallists
Olympic rowers of Great Britain
Rowers at the 1912 Summer Olympics
Olympic gold medallists for Great Britain
Fellows of the Zoological Society of London
Olympic medalists in rowing
Members of Leander Club
Oxford University Boat Club rowers
Medalists at the 1912 Summer Olympics
Sudan Political Service officers